Taenia hydatigena (thin-necked bladderworm, causative agent of cysticercosis) is one of the adult forms of the canine and feline tapeworm. This infection has a worldwide geographic distribution. Humans with taeniasis can infect other humans or animal intermediate hosts by eggs and gravid proglottids passed in the feces.

Transmission 

Taenia hydatigena eggs can cause cysticercosis in humans. Intermediate hosts, which harbor the disease for a short period of time, include: sheep, horses, cattle, pigs, and deer.  Definitive hosts, which harbor the parasite until it reaches maturity and during sexual reproduction, include dogs, foxes, and other canids. The cysticercus, the larval form, travels and persists in the liver for 18 – 30 days, then burrows out into the peritoneal cavity and attaches to the viscera. When the sheep viscera is scavenged and the scavenger ingests the cysticercus, the protoscolex attaches to the small intestinal wall and the worm begins to form proglottids. Gravid proglottids, containing the eggs, move from the end of the worm and leave the body in the feces. The prepatent period is about 51 days.

Symptoms 

Like any other disease, the symptoms vary from its bodily location and when pertaining to the density of larvae.  Many of the major symptoms are the result of inflammation during larval degeneration or a mass effect from the parasite. Neurocysticercosis is a serious form of cysticercosis.  Common symptoms include chronic headaches and seizures.  Other symptoms include:  nausea, vomiting, vertigo, ataxia, confusion or other changes in mental health, behavioral abnormalities, progressive dementia, and focal neurologic signs.

Diagnosis 

Computed tomography (CT) scans and magnetic resonance imaging (MRI) are used to identify cysticerci in the brain. An x-ray scan can detect calcified cysts all over the body. A biopsy can be used to look for subcutaneous nodules in the body. An ocular scan can be used to detect larvae in the eyes. (1)

Prevention 

Cysticercosis is rare in the U.S. and most parts of Europe. It is primarily found in immigrant species, or species that have arrived from another country. The main objectives are as follows: to reduce the chances of becoming infected, and, if infected, to reduce the chances of the infection being transmitted. Educating the general public will help change how the disease is perceived. This could help people better understand risks and allow people to not live in fear of the disease. The high prevalence of some zoonotic helminths could indicate that humans in specific regions such as; the mediterranean area, south of the Sahara in the semi-arid areas of East Africa, South Africa, South America, East Europe and parts of China. These areas are at serious risk of transmission and, if all the preventive measures are not taken, the human infection may spread quickly. Preventive programs, such as elimination of the stray dogs from cities and rural regions, could be necessary in this instance. However, control of wild canids can be difficult, but there are other regulatory measures that can be applied to communities, such as health education and implementing strict regulations of livestock slaughtering in slaughter houses and farms, could reduce the risk of parasite transmission. In addition, it is important for public health authorities, pet owners, physicians and veterinarians in these regions to pay close attention to patients and to remain informed of any possible outbreaks and transmission. In a study conducted at Washington State University, the effects of heat treatment were analyzed on the young forms of Taenia hydatigena. They observed that when the eggs were treated at temperatures of 60 degrees C they did not establish in the hosts. This could be influential in future prevention methods.

Treatment 

Cysticercosis can be treated using anthelmintic drugs (i.e. albendazole and praziquantel). Surgery might be required for cysticerci in the eye, cerebral ventricles, and spinal cord.  Asymptomatic infections and calcified cysticerci probably will not require treatment. Fecal flotation may reveal eggs if a gravid proglottid has been broken in the feces. After the animal dies, a necropsy is performed to see if cysticerci are found in the abdominal cavity of sheep and goats.

References

External links 
 

Cestoda
Foodborne illnesses
Parasitic animals of mammals